Gnathifera bidentella is a fringe-tufted moth species. It was described by Reinhard Gaedike in 1981. It is found in Queensland, Australia.

References

Moths described in 1981
Epermeniidae
Moths of Australia